Torpo Stave Church is a stave church located in Torpo, a small village in Ål municipality in Viken county, Norway.  Torpo is located along Norwegian National Road 7, the Norwegian national road which runs between Oslo and Bergen.

History 
Built in 1192, the Torpo Stave Church is the oldest building within the valley and traditional district of Hallingdal. The church was dedicated to Saint Margareta. The stave church was purchased by the municipality in 1875. It was initially planned to expand it with an annex to the east, but in 1879 it was decided instead to modernize the interior with new ceiling and gallery. Following protest from the Ancient Monuments Society (Fortidsminneforeningen), the municipality decided to build a new church (Torpo Kyrkje) on the adjacent property. The new church was built north of the old one with the two churches standing side by side.

Runic inscription N 110 
The Torpo Stave Church is one of two stave churches that are signed by their craftsmen, the other being the church at Ål. In both churches a runic inscription reads: Thorolf built this church. The full runic inscription in the Torpo Stave Church, which is listed as N 110 in the Rundata catalog, reads:
§A þorolfr : gærþi : kirku þesa ÷: askrimr ÷ hakon ÷ ælikr ÷ pal ¶ æinriþi ÷ siønti ÷ þorolfr
§B þorer ÷ ræist
§C olafr
This translates as "Þórolfr made this church. Ásgrímr, Hákon, Erlingr, Páll, Eindriði, Sjaundi, Þórulfr. Þórir carved. Ólafr."

Gallery

References

Further reading 
 Bugge Gunnar. Stavkirker, Stave Churches in Norway  (Dreyers Forlag. Oslo: 1983) 
 Christie, Sigrid and Haakon. Norges kirker – Buskerud (Norske Mindesmerker. Oslo:  1981) 
 Dietrichson, Lorentz. Norske Stavkirker: Studier Over Deres System, Oprindelse Og Historiske Udvikling (Kristiania: 1892) New edition: (Gregg Publishing; 1971) 
 Leif Anker (2005) The Norwegian Stave Churches (Oslo: Arfo Forlag)

External links 

 Torpo Stave Church in Stavkirke.org
 Torpo Stave Church photo gallery

Ål
Buildings and structures completed in 1192
Churches in Viken
Runic inscriptions
Buildings and structures owned by the Society for the Preservation of Ancient Norwegian Monuments
Stave churches in Norway